The 1978 United States Senate election in New Jersey was held on November 7, 1978. Incumbent Republican U.S. Senator Clifford P. Case ran for re-election to a fifth term in office, but was narrowly defeated in the Republican primary by anti-tax conservative Jeff Bell, who then went on to lose the general election to Democratic nominee Bill Bradley.

Primary elections were held on June 6, 1978.

Republican primary

Candidates
Jeff Bell, political aide and speechwriter for Ronald Reagan's 1976 presidential campaign
Clifford P. Case, incumbent U.S. Senator

Results

Democratic primary

Candidates
Wesley K. Bell, former Mayor of Stafford Township
Bill Bradley, former professional basketball player
Richard Leone, former New Jersey State Treasurer
Alexander J. Menza, State Senator from Hillside
Kenneth C. McCarthy
Ray Rollinson

Results

General election

Candidates
Jeff Bell, political aide and speechwriter for Ronald Reagan's 1976 presidential campaign (Republican)
Robert Bowen (Labor)
Bill Bradley, former professional basketball player (Democratic)
J.M. Carter (God We Trust)
Alice Conner (Socialist Workers)
Bill Gahres (Down With Lawyers)
Paul Ferguson (Socialist Labor)
Jasper C. Gould (Independent)
Jack Moyers (Libertarian)
Herbert H. Shaw, perennial candidate (Politicians are Crooks)
William R. Thorn (Independent)

Polling

with Case

with Bell

Results

References

1978
New Jersey
United States Senate